Trophy is a 2017 documentary film about trophy hunting and wildlife conservation. After airing on CNN, it was nominated for an Emmy for Outstanding Nature Documentary at the 40th News and Documentary Emmy Award.

References

External links
 
 Trophy at CNN
 

2017 documentary films
2017 films
Hunting in film
Wildlife conservation